Etawah Junction railway station (station code ETW) is one of the main railway stations on the Kanpur–Delhi section of  Howrah–Delhi main line. It is located in Etawah district in the Indian state of Uttar Pradesh. It serves Etawah and the surrounding areas. Etawah stands near the confluence of the Yamuna and the Chambal.

History
The East Indian Railway Company initiated efforts to develop a railway line from Howrah to Delhi in the mid nineteenth century. Even when the line to Mughalsarai was being constructed and only the lines near Howrah were put in operation, the first train ran from Allahabad to Kanpur in 1859 and the Kanpur–Etawah section was opened to traffic in the 1860s. For the first through train from Howrah to Delhi in 1864, coaches were ferried on boats across the Yamuna at Allahabad. With the completion of the Old Naini Bridge across the Yamuna  through trains started running in 1865–66.

In 2015, Etawah railway station was developed into a Junction after completion of Etawah–Bhind–Gwalior & Etawah–Mainpuri railline. The first passenger train on this route was started on 27 February 2016. The Etawah–Mainpuri railway line is also operational since 2017.

Another line goes to Agra Via Bah which was too started in 2016. Line from Etawah Jn. goes to Udi Morh Jn. where the line bifurcates, one going to Gwalior via Bhind & another going to Agra Cantt. via Bah.

Electrification 
The Kanpur–Panki sector was electrified in 1968–69, Panki–Tundla in 1971–72.

References

External links
  Trains at Etawah
 

Railway junction stations in Uttar Pradesh
Railway stations in Etawah district
Allahabad railway division
Transport in Etawah
1866 establishments in India